The 2000 PBA All-Filipino Cup Finals was the best-of-7 championship series of the 2000 PBA All-Filipino Cup and the conclusion of the conference's playoffs. The Alaska Milkmen and Purefoods Tender Juicy Hotdogs played for the 75th championship contested by the league.

The Alaska Milkmen won their third All-Filipino crown in the last five years with a 4–1 series victory over Purefoods TJ Hotdogs. The title-conquest was their 10th championship as Alaska is now the third most successful ballclub in the league.

Kenneth Duremdes won on his second Finals MVP in All-Filipino Cup Finals.

Series scoring summary

Games summary

Game 1

The milkmen were held to a finals low five points in the fourth quarter. From a 54–47 lead entering the final period, the milkmen went scoreless as Boyet Fernandez of Purefoods drilled in three triples that spark a 19–0 windup in the last 7:01.

Game 2

Alaska led 43–35 at halftime. The milkmen leads by as many as 25 points in the 3rd quarter and coast to an easy victory.

Game 3

Bong Hawkins' three-point play off Rey Evangelista broke a 71-all deadlock as Alaska completed a second half comeback.

Game 4

Purefoods came close to within five points in the third period after being down by as many as 23 points. Alvin Patrimonio scored 10 of the hotdogs' 30 points in that quarter. Rodney Santos' timely jumpers in the fourth quarter put the game away and gave Alaska a 3–1 series lead.

Game 5

The hotdogs led at 66–58 after three quarters. Rodney Santos and Poch Juinio teamed up for 16 points in the fourth quarter to rally the milkmen from six points down to lead 73–71. Johnny Abarrientos hit a long jumper with 14.9 seconds to go to give Alaska an 85–82 cushion. Purefoods' Noy Castillo made two free throws for the final count as the milkmen missed all its four gift shots, including a pair from James Walkvist with 0.5 seconds left. Kenneth Duremdes won his second Finals MVP and Alaska captures win on his 10th championship title.

Rosters

Broadcast notes

References

External links
PBA official website

2000
2000 PBA season
Alaska Aces (PBA) games
Magnolia Hotshots games
PBA All-Filipino Cup Finals